Mahmudul Islam Chowdhury is a Jatiya Party (Ershad) politician and the former Member of Parliament of Chittagong-15. He was the first mayor of Chittagong City Corporation.

Career
Mahmudul Islam Chowdhury was elected to parliament from Chittagong-15 as a Bangladesh Nationalist Party candidate in 1979 Bangladeshi general election He was elected to parliament from Chittagong-15 as a Jatiya Party candidate in 1986 and 1988.

References

Living people
1950 births
People from Banshkhali Upazila
University of Chittagong alumni
Bangladesh Nationalist Party politicians
Jatiya Party politicians
2nd Jatiya Sangsad members
3rd Jatiya Sangsad members
4th Jatiya Sangsad members
Mayors of Chattogram City Corporation